KGAK (1330 AM) is a radio station  broadcasting a Native American format. Licensed to Gallup, New Mexico, United States. The station is currently owned by KRJG, Inc.

References

External links
KGAK website
KGAK on Facebook

FCC History Cards for KGAK

GAK
Radio stations established in 1946
Native American history of New Mexico
Native American radio